The 2012 season was the St. Louis Rams' 75th in the National Football League, their 18th in St. Louis and their first under head coach Jeff Fisher. Finishing at 7–8–1, they improved on their 2–14 record from 2011. In Week 10 against the San Francisco 49ers, the game ended in a 24–24 tie, the first since the 2008 NFL season. It was Sam Bradford's second and final full season as the Rams starting quarterback as two torn ACLs sidelined him for much of the next season and the entire 2014 season.

Personnel changes
On January 2, 2012, Rams' owner Stan Kroenke fired coach Steve Spagnuolo and GM Billy Devaney after a 2–14 season, and their 10–38 record after three seasons.
Former Tennessee Titans head coach Jeff Fisher was signed to be the new head coach and Les Snead was hired to be the new general manager.

2012 draft class

NOTES
 The team traded their original first round pick (#2 overall) to the Washington Redskins for Washington's first and second round picks in 2012, along with Washington's first round picks in 2013 and 2014.
 Rams traded the 45th pick to the Bears for the 50th overall pick and the Bears 5th round pick (#150 overall)
supplemental compensatory selection

Staff

Final roster

Schedule

Preseason

Regular season

Note: Intra-division opponents are in bold text.

Game summaries

Week 1: at Detroit Lions
{{Americanfootballbox
 |titlestyle=;text-align:center;
 |state=autocollapse
 |title= Week One: St. Louis Rams at Detroit Lions – Game summary
 |date=September 9
 |time=1:00 p.m. EDT/12:00 p.m. CDT
 |road=Rams
 |R1=3|R2=10|R3=0|R4=10
 |home=Lions
 |H1=0|H2=10|H3=3|H4=14
 |stadium=Ford Field, Detroit
 |attendance=62,315
 |weather=Played indoors (dome stadium)
 |referee=Donovan Briggans
 |TV=Fox
 |TVAnnouncers=Chris Myers, Tim Ryan and Jaime Maggio
 |reference=
 |scoring=
First quarter
 STL – Greg Zuerlein 48-yard field goal, Rams 3–0, Drive: 10 plays, 36 yards, 5:49.
Second quarter
 DET – Joique Bell 1-yard run (Jason Hanson kick), Lions 7–3, Drive: 14 plays, 80 yards, 7:31.
 STL – Greg Zuerlein 29-yard field goal, Lions 7–6, Drive: 8 plays, 43 yards, 4:30.
 STL – Cortland Finnegan 31-yard interception return (Greg Zuerlein kick), Rams 13–7, Drive: 1 play, 31 yards, 0:00.
 DET – Jason Hanson 41-yard field goal, Rams 13–10, Drive: 5 plays, 53 yards, 1:08.
Third quarter
 DET – Jason Hanson 45-yard field goal, Tied 13–13, Drive: 5 plays, 15 yards, 2:54.
Fourth quarter
 STL – Brandon Gibson 23-yard pass from Sam Bradford (Greg Zuerlein kick), Rams 20–13, Drive: 5 plays, 47 yards, 2:42.
 DET – Kevin Smith 5-yard run (Jason Hanson kick), Tied 20–20, 5 plays, 80 yards, 2:26. STL – Greg Zuerlein 46-yard field goal, Rams 23–20, Drive: 13 plays, 52 yards, 5:24. DET – Kevin Smith 5-yard pass from Matthew Stafford (Jason Hanson kick), Lions 27–23, Drive: 9 plays, 80 yards, 1:45.'' |stats=Top passers STL – Sam Bradford – 17/25, 198 yards, 1 touchdown
 DET – Matthew Stafford – 32/48, 355 yards, 1 touchdown, 3 interceptionsTop rushers STL – Steven Jackson – 21 carries, 53 yards
 DET – Kevin Smith – 13 carries, 52 yards, 1 touchdownTop receivers STL – Danny Amendola – 5 receptions, 70 yards
 DET – Calvin Johnson – 6 receptions, 111 yardsTop tacklers STL – Cortland Finnegan – 9 tackles, 1 assist, 1 interception, 1 touchdown
 DET – Justin Durant – 7 tackles, 5 assists
}}
The Rams started their season on the road against the Lions. The Rams drew first blood in the first quarter with a 48-yard field goal from Greg Zuerlein to take a 3–0 lead for the only score of that quarter. The Lions then took a 7–3 lead with Joique Bell's 1-yard run for a touchdown in the 2nd quarter. The Rams responded with a 29-yard field goal from Zuerlein as they came up within a point 7–6 before on the Lions' next possession, Matthew Stafford was picked off by Cortland Finnegan and it was returned 31 yards for a touchdown as the Rams retook the lead 13–7. The Lions then responded with Jason Hanson kicking a 41-yard field goal to shorten the Rams' lead to 13–10 at halftime. After the break, the Lions scored first with Jason Hanson kicking a 45-yard field goal to tie the game 13–13 for the only score of the 3rd quarter. However, the Rams moved back into the lead in the 4th quarter with Brandon Gibson's 23-yard catch from Sam Bradford to make it 20–13. The Lions tied the game back up with Kevin Smith running for a touchdown from 5 yards out to tie the game 20–20. The Rams then retook the lead with Greg Zuerlein kicking a 46-yard field goal to make the score 23–20. On their last possession, the Lions moved down the field and Matthew Stafford found Kevin Smith on a 5-yard touchdown pass to make the final score 27–23 as the Rams began their season 0–1.

Week 2: vs. Washington Redskins

After a tough loss, the Rams returned home for a game against the Redskins. With the win, the team improved to 1–1. Before the game, the Rams were fined $20,000 for not reporting Steven Jackson's injury.

Week 3: at Chicago Bears

After defeating the Redskins at home, the Rams traveled on the road against the Bears. The Bears scored first in the first quarter with a 54-yard field goal from Robbie Gould to take a 3–0 lead for the only score of the quarter. In the 2nd quarter, the Bears increased their lead when Michael Bush scored a touchdown on a 5-yard run to make the score 10–0. The Rams responded with Greg Zuerlein's 56-yard field goal to shorten the lead to 10–3 at halftime. In the 3rd quarter, the Rams drew closer as Zuerlein kicked a 46-yard field goal to make the score 10–6 for the only score of the quarter. But in the 4th quarter, the Bears held on for victory as Gould kicked a 22-yard field goal to make it 13–6 and then on the Rams' next possession, Sam Bradford was intercepted by Major Wright who then returned it 45 yards for a touchdown to make it 20–6. Gould kicked a 37-yard field goal to make the final score 23–6 as the Rams dropped to 1–2.

Week 4: vs. Seattle Seahawks

With the win, the Rams improved to 2–2, And 2–0 in home games.

Week 5: vs. Arizona Cardinals

With the win, the Rams improved to 3–2. This was also the first time since 2006 the Rams were at least a game above .500. The team was 3–0 at home and 0–2 in road games at this point of the season.

Week 6: at Miami Dolphins

With the loss, the Rams fell to 3–3. With the Seahawks' win over the Patriots, the Rams were at the bottom of the NFC West. The team was also 0–3 in road games.

Week 7: vs. Green Bay Packers

With the loss, the Rams fell to 3–4 and suffered their first home loss of the season.

Week 8: vs. New England PatriotsInternational Series'''

With the loss, the Rams fell to 3–5 on the season. In this rematch of Super Bowl XXXVI, the Rams traveled to London and were considered the home team in the 2012 International Series. The Rams' struggles continued as the team lost to the Patriots 45–7 heading into their bye week. Patriots quarterback Tom Brady was able to have his way against the Rams' secondary, throwing touchdowns to four different Patriot wide receivers including two to ex-Ram Brandon Lloyd.

Week 10: at San Francisco 49ers

With their 3-game losing streak snapped, the Rams' record stood at 3–5–1 after the game ended in a 24–24 tie. This was the first NFL tie game since 2008 when the Bengals and Eagles played to a 13–13 tie game. It was also the first tie between the Rams and 49ers since 1968 when both teams played to a 20–20 tie game while the Rams were still in Los Angeles, thus this was the first tie game between the Rams based in St. Louis and the 49ers.

Week 11: vs. New York Jets

With the loss, the Rams fell to 3–6–1. After going 3–0 in their first 3 home games, their home record dropped to 3–3.

Week 12: at Arizona Cardinals

With the win, the Rams improved to 4–6–1, won their first road game of the season and swept the Cardinals for the first time since 2003.

Week 13: vs. San Francisco 49ers

With the win, the Rams improved to 5–6–1. After going into OT with the 49ers for the second time during the season, the Rams once again faced the threat of a tie. However kicker Greg Zuerlein kicked a 54-yard field goal to seal the win for the Rams.

Week 14: at Buffalo Bills

With the road win, the Rams improved their record to 6–6–1. The win was attributed to a late fourth quarter comeback drive by Rams quarterback Sam Bradford. The drive resulted in a touchdown reception by Brandon Gibson, bringing the score to 13–12. The Rams then scored a 2-point conversion on a quick pass to Danny Amendola, making the score 15–12 Rams. With under 2 minutes left in the game, the Bills attempted a comeback of their own, but came up short in what resulted in the Rams win.

Week 15: vs. Minnesota Vikings

With the loss, the Rams fell to a 6–7–1 record on the season. The Rams' loss came due to a stellar, over 200 yards rushing performance by Vikings running back Adrian Peterson, and by early mistakes by the Rams' offense. During the game, Steven Jackson rushed for 73 yards, making him the 27th player in NFL history to reach 10,000 rushing yards in his career.

Week 16: at Tampa Bay Buccaneers
 Despite the win, the Rams were officially eliminated from playoff contention due to the Vikings 23–6 win over the Texans, but are aiming to finish with a winning record for the first time since 2004 with a win at Seattle at next week

Week 17: at Seattle Seahawks

After winning over the Buccaneers, the Rams traveled up to Seattle to take on the Seahawks with a division record of 4–0–1. The Seahawks defeated the Rams and hand the team their only divisional loss of the season. The Rams finished 7–8–1, their 6th straight losing season dating back to 2007 and their 9th straight non-winning season dating back to 2004.

Standings

References

External links
 

St. Louis
St. Louis Rams seasons
St Louis